Kamembe may refer to:

 Kamembe, the industrial and transport heart of Cyangugu in Rwanda.
 Kamembe Airport, the main airport of Cyangugu.